Kecskeméti TE, for sponsorship reasons named KTE-Duna Aszfalt, is the basketball team of the Hungarian sports club Kecskeméti TE, based in Kecskemét. The team plays in the NB I/A, the Hungarian first division.

Honours

Domestic competitions
Nemzeti Bajnokság I/A (National Championship of Hungary)
 Runners-up (1): 2014–15

Magyar Kupa (National Cup of Hungary)
 Finalist (1): 2015
Hungarian Second League
Champions (1): 2012–13

Current players

Season by season

 Cancelled due to the COVID-19 pandemic in Hungary.

Names
KTE Kosárlabda Klub (2012–2013)
KTE-Duna Aszfalt (2013–present)

References

External links
Official website 

Basketball teams in Hungary
Basketball teams established in 1938
1938 establishments in Hungary